Rasayani is a town located in Khalapur taluka of the Raigad district, Maharashtra, India. In Rasayani Biggest MIDC in Khalapur Taluka lots  Educational  institute  Rasayani . 64 km Away from Mumbai  and 100 km Away from Pune . District Headquarters Alibag 50 km

References

Villages in Raigad district